Li Changping (born 1963) and originally from Dongting Lake, was a rural cadre and is now a researcher in Beijing.

Li worked in Qipan, where he became secretary of his local commune in Hubei province in 1983. In 1999 he completed a master's degree in Economics and returned to Hubei as a party secretary. He became famous after writing a letter to then Chinese premier Zhu Rongji complaining about the way local officials were managing farm workers, with many workers paying more tax than officially allowed to support the liefstyles of local officials. The letter was published in the newspaper Southern Weekend, the readers of which voted Li 'Man of the Year'.

He gives a first hand account of fighting against corruption in his book I Told the Premier the Truth. An interview with him appears in the book One China, Many Paths

Li was described by The Guardian in 2002 as "China's most famous advocate for peasant rights".

Publications
Wuo xiang zhongli suoshihua (I Told the Premier the Truth) (2002), Guangmin Ribao Chubanshe

References

1963 births
Living people
Chinese activists
Huazhong Agricultural University alumni
Zhongnan University of Economics and Law alumni
Academic staff of Hebei University
People from Jingzhou